Joseph Garcia may refer to:

Joseph Garcia (Gibraltarian politician) (born 1967), Gibraltarian historian and politician
Joseph Garcia (American politician) (born 1957), 48th Lieutenant Governor of Colorado
Joseph Andre Garcia (born 1999), Filipino child actor
Joseph Christopher Garcia (1971–2018), escaped convict of the Texas Seven